Suzanne Carolyn Purdy  is a New Zealand psychology academic specialising in auditory processing and hearing loss. She is currently a full professor and head of the School of Psychology at the University of Auckland.

Academic career
After a 1990 PhD titled Reliability, sensitivity, and validity of magnitude estimation, paired comparisons, and category scaling at the University of Iowa, Purdy moved to the University of Auckland, rising to full professor in 2012.

In the 2021 Queen's Birthday Honours, Purdy was appointed a Companion of the New Zealand Order of Merit, for services to audiology and communication science.

Selected works

References

External links

  
 

Living people
Year of birth missing (living people)
New Zealand women academics
University of Iowa alumni
Academic staff of the University of Auckland
New Zealand psychologists
New Zealand women psychologists
Companions of the New Zealand Order of Merit